Neff Nunatak is a nunatak rising to about 1,500 m, located 1 nautical mile (1.9 km) southeast of Schmutzler Nunatak in the southeast end of the Grossman Nunataks, Palmer Land. Mapped by United States Geological Survey (USGS) from U.S. Navy aerial photographs taken 1965–68. Named by Advisory Committee on Antarctic Names (US-ACAN) in 1988 after Richard J. Neff, USGS cartographer, a member of the winter party at Australia's Casey Station, 1975.

Nunataks of Palmer Land